Lisa Lisa and Cult Jam were an urban contemporary band and one of the first freestyle music groups to emerge from New York City in the 1980s. Cult Jam consisted of vocalist Lisa Lisa (born Lisa Valez), guitarist/bassist Alex "Spanador" Moseley, and drummer/keyboardist Mike Hughes. They were assembled and initially produced by Full Force.

History
Lisa Lisa and Cult Jam was formed after Velez auditioned with Full Force, a production team from East Flatbush, Brooklyn, at the age of 14. The group released their debut album Lisa Lisa & Cult Jam with Full Force in 1985. The group was signed by Columbia Records and the label released their single "I Wonder If I Take You Home" to the European division of CBS Records in 1983 for the compilation album Breakdancing. Stateside club DJs began playing the single from the import LP during 1984, and thus the U.S. division of CBS, Columbia Records, released the record. It quickly became a chart-topper on Billboard'''s Hot Dance/Disco chart. It then crossed over to the R&B chart where it peaked at No. 6, and then to the pop chart, peaking at No. 34 in summer 1985. The single eventually went gold.

"I Wonder If I Take You Home" was followed by another club hit, "Can You Feel the Beat", which also went to No. 40 on the R&B chart in late 1985. A sampling of the lyrics of this song would later be used by Nina Sky for their hit single "Move Ya Body" in 2004. Their third single, the ballad "All Cried Out", also went gold, going to number No. 3 R&B and No. 8 pop in summer 1986. "All Cried Out" was later recorded by Allure in 1997 and was a hit in 1998. Lisa Lisa & Cult Jam with Full Force went platinum.

Their second album, Spanish Fly, was a success in 1987. It spawned two No. 1 pop hits, "Head to Toe" and "Lost in Emotion", both of which went gold. "Head to Toe" also parked at No. 1 R&B for two weeks and stayed in the pop top 5 nearly three months, while "Lost in Emotion's" video became the fourth most played of 1987 on MTV. Spanish Fly went platinum, peaking at No. 7 on the Billboard 200 chart. Other singles from the album were the ballad "Someone to Love Me for Me" (No. 7 R&B), and "Everything Will B-Fine" (No. 9 R&B).

In between albums they recorded "Go for Yours", which was featured in the movie Caddyshack II.

Their third album was titled Straight to the Sky and was released in 1989. It featured the single "Little Jackie Wants to Be a Star".
Their fourth and final album, Straight Outta Hell's Kitchen, was less of a success, though it did include a hit with "Let the Beat Hit 'Em", which was a No. 1 hit on both the R&B and club charts. The group disbanded in 1991.

Discography
Studio albums

Compilation albumsHead to Toe (1995, Sony Music)Lisa Lisa and Friends (1995, Sony Music)Past, Present & Future (1996, Thump)Super Hits (1997, Sony Music)Playlist: The Very Best of Lisa Lisa & Cult Jam with Full Force'' (2010, Columbia/Legacy)

Singles

See also
List of number-one hits (United States)
List of artists who reached number one on the Hot 100 (U.S.)
List of number-one dance hits (United States)
List of artists who reached number one on the U.S. Dance chart

References

External links

American dance music groups
Electronic music groups from New York (state)
American house music groups
American freestyle music groups
Columbia Records artists
Musical groups established in 1985
Musical groups disestablished in 1991
1985 establishments in New York City
1991 disestablishments in New York (state)
Musical groups from New York City